Malatya railway station is the main railway station in the city of Malatya, Turkey. The station was built in 1931 by the Turkish State Railways as part of the railway to Diyarbakır. TCDD Taşımacılık operates three trains through the station: the Lake Van Express to Ankara or Tatvan, the Southern Express to Ankara or Kurtalan and the Euphrates Express to Elazığ or Adana.

The station building was built in the Art deco style and is similar to the station buildings of Sivas, Manisa and Diyarbakır stations.

Malatya station also houses the TCDD regional headquarters for District 5.

See also
Sivas station
Manisa station
Diyarbakır station

References

External links
Malatya station information
Malatya station timetable

Railway stations in Malatya Province
Railway stations opened in 1931
1931 establishments in Turkey
Art Deco railway stations